The Texas Rangers is a 1936 American Western film directed by King Vidor and starring Fred MacMurray and Jack Oakie. The picture was nominated for Best Sound Recording (Franklin Hansen) at the 1936 Oscars. The film was inspired by incidents from Walter Prescott Webb's 1935 history book The Texas Rangers, A Century Of Frontier Defense but filmed in New Mexico.

The film involves two out-of-luck Texas Rangers who must arrest an old friend turned outlaw. The supporting cast features Lloyd Nolan,  Edward Ellis, Jean Parker, and George "Gabby" Hayes. In February 2020, the film was shown at the 70th Berlin International Film Festival, as part of a retrospective dedicated to King Vidor's career.

Plot
Sam, Jim and "Wahoo" are outlaws with a sweet racket. Wahoo is a stagecoach driver who feeds information of routes and cargoes of stagecoaches to his outlaw confederates Sam and Jim, who rob the stage and shoot at Wahoo to prove he has nothing to do with the robberies. The three split up one night when lawmen surround their camp and they make their escape but Sam is nowhere to be found.

Wahoo and Jim continue their racket until one day a Texas Ranger rides shotgun on the couch next to Wahoo. Jim is supposed to rob the stage when the stagecoach stops to water their mules but Wahoo has a feeling about the Ranger and won't let Jim rob the stage, instead bundling a mystified Jim on board as a paying passenger. Wahoo and Jim realise their lives have been saved when the Ranger quickly kills two other robbers.

Needing money and impressed by the Ranger's reputation, Jim and Wahoo join the Rangers with the pair planning to use the position to enrich themselves. When sent to locate cattle rustlers Jim and Wahoo discover they are led by Sam who agrees that teaming up to work both ends against the middle will make all of them rich. However Wahoo and Jim begin to have second thoughts when they take on a group of hostile Indians who have murdered the family of young David whom they look after. Jim gets a strong reputation among the Rangers when he saves their company from annihilation by a large Apache war party. Jim becomes so trusted he is sent to singlehandedly brings a murdering town boss by arresting and prosecuting him. Jim originally plans to install Sam as the new town boss but changes his mind and has Sam promise to leave the area.

Sam begins a reign of terror but Jim seems too noticeably reluctant to bring him to justice.

Cast
Fred MacMurray as Jim Hawkins 
Jack Oakie as Henry B. "Wahoo" Jones 
Jean Parker as Amanda Bailey 
Lloyd Nolan as Sam "Polka Dot" McGee 
Edward Ellis as Major Bailey 
Benny Bartlett as David
Frank Shannon as Capt. Stafford
Frank Cordell as Ranger Ditson 
Richard Carle as Casper Johnson 
Jed Prouty as District Attorney Dave Twitchell
Fred Kohler as Jess Higgens
Charles Middleton as Higgins's lawyer
George "Gabby" Hayes as Judge Snow

Reception
Writing for The Spectator in 1936, Graham Greene gave the film a neutral review. While favorably comparing King Vidor's direction to D. W. Griffith, Greene noted that "the story gets in the way" effectively reducing the epic quality of the drama.

The film was followed by a sequel in 1940 called The Texas Rangers Ride Again with a new cast. The film was also remade in 1949 as Streets of Laredo.

See also
 List of American films of 1936

References

External links

1936 Western (genre) films
1936 films
American black-and-white films
1930s English-language films
Films directed by King Vidor
Paramount Pictures films
Films about the Texas Ranger Division
Films based on non-fiction books
American Western (genre) films
1930s American films